Fresno Airport can refer to several airports in or near Fresno, California:
Fresno Yosemite International Airport
Fresno Chandler Executive Airport